Waseemuddin Qureshi is a Pakistani politician who had been a Member of the Provincial Assembly of Sindh, from May 2013 to May 2018.

Early life and education
He was born on 11 June 1967 in Karachi.

He has a degree of Bachelor of Laws from Sindh Muslim Law College.

Political career

He was elected to the Provincial Assembly of Sindh as a candidate of Mutahida Quami Movement (MQM) from Constituency PS-98 KARACHI-X in 2013 Pakistani general election.

He was re-elected to Provincial Assembly of Sindh as a candidate of MQM from Constituency PS-123 (Karachi Central-I) in 2018 Pakistani general election.

References

Living people
Sindh MPAs 2013–2018
1967 births
Muttahida Qaumi Movement MPAs (Sindh)
Sindh MPAs 2018–2023